Marta Krásová (16 March 1901 – 20 February 1970) was a Czech operatic mezzo-soprano who had an active international career with major opera houses in Europe from 1922 until 1966. Born in Protivín, she died in Vráž, in the Beroun District.

References

1901 births
1970 deaths
People from Protivín
People from the Kingdom of Bohemia
Czechoslovak women opera singers
Operatic mezzo-sopranos